The Purifiers, also known as the Stryker Crusade, are a fictional paramilitary/terrorist organization appearing in American comic books published by Marvel Comics. They are usually depicted as enemies of the X-Men. Created by writer Chris Claremont and artist Brent Anderson, they first appeared in the 1982 graphic novel X-Men: God Loves, Man Kills.

A force of Christian fundamentalists led by the ruthless Reverend William Stryker, the Purifiers see themselves in a holy war against mutants, believing them to be the children of the Devil and thus worthy of extermination. The Purifiers made only sporadic appearances since their first appearance, but returned to prominence in the 2000s, when they became prominent antagonists in the series New X-Men and X-Force, and played a major role in the 2007 - 2008 crossover storyline X-Men: Messiah Complex.

The Purifiers appear in the television series The Gifted as antagonists to the mutants, although not a wide organization like the comics. They are led by failed Senator Benedict Ryan played by Peter Gallagher.

Fictional organization biography
In the 1982 graphic novel God Loves, Man Kills, the Purifiers are first seen aiding their vicious leader Rev. William Stryker in his plans to annihilate the mutant race. The Purifiers work to fulfill many of Stryker's goals, abducting Professor X and several of the X-Men, killing mutant children, and defending Stryker's church against the X-Men and Magneto. Eventually, one of the guards, horrified that Stryker would attempt to kill the young mutant Kitty Pryde, shoots the secular fraud of a "pastor" and ends his genocidal plans. With Stryker arrested and sent to prison, the Purifiers disband in his absence.

Stryker resurfaced in a strange location at a haven for mutant children. He was possessing Shadowcat and in league with Lady Deathstryke. This happened all quickly and in the end, Stryker apparently sacrificed himself to save the mutants and all the other humans. A question is raised if this even was the real Stryker.

However, the Purifiers would eventually re-emerge, stronger than ever. Following his release from prison, Stryker found the highly advanced Sentinel Nimrod in his church, having teleported there using its advanced time-travel technology. Accessing the damaged Sentinel's memory core, Stryker saw the effects of Decimation months before M-Day actually occurred, enabling him to lay the groundwork for a renewed campaign against mutants. Using the knowledge of the future contained within Nimrod, Stryker was able to save numerous people from untimely deaths, accrediting his interventions as miracles from God, allowing him to substantially increase the ranks of the Purifiers. The use of the Nimrod visions also allowed Stryker to gain the support of prominent political and business leaders, as well as the veteran assassin Matthew Risman. The Purifiers also contacted the branch of the Weapon X program known as the Facility, and commissioned its scientists to construct Predator X, in order to hunt down a mutant Stryker saw as the Antichrist. Finally, the Purifiers obtained advanced weaponry included fully automatic rifles, anti-tank weapons and Vibranium-based weaponry to aid them in their crusade, and specially targeted Wallflower and Dust, the two mutants the Nimrod data showed would be instrumental in the defeat of the Purifiers.

When M-Day struck and over ninety-nine percent of the world's mutants were rendered powerless, the Purifiers were more than ready to begin their campaign. Their first attack against the Xavier Institute destroyed a bus carrying over forty-five depowered students, killing them all. As Risman assassinated Wallflower per Stryker's instructions, the vicious pastor was able to deceive the mutant Icarus into betraying his teammates, giving them another avenue of attack.

The Purifiers' crusade culminated in an all-out attack against the Xavier Institute, in an attempt to eliminate the New X-Men. With the majority of the X-Men on patrol and searching for the Purifiers, and the O.N.E. Sentinels disabled with the hand of Nimrod, the Purifiers were able to breach the grounds and mansion with determined fighting. While one force of Purifiers assaulted the encampment of the 198, the rest converged on the mansion itself, wounding numerous students, along with Emma Frost and Cannonball, and killing the Institute student known as Quill. Despite the extensive damage and injuries caused in their attack, the death of Stryker at the hands of Elixir and the return of the X-Men forced the Purifiers to withdraw, having taken numerous casualties in the process.

With Stryker's death, Matthew Risman has taken command of the Purifiers, vowing not to cease "until the world has been purified." Since the attack on the institute, the Purifiers have been lying low and rebuilding their strength for another offensive, as well as trying to find and recover the missing Predator X.

During the Messiah Complex storyline, The Purifiers are one of the three factions, along with the X-Men and Marauders, searching for the first mutant baby born since M-Day.

All three groups were alerted to the baby's birth more or less simultaneously, and headed for the remote Alaskan village where the birth took place. The Purifier task force beat both the X-Men and the Marauders to the scene, and proceeded to "cull" every child in the city in order to make sure the mutant baby did not survive. They were then attacked by the Marauders, who killed several Purifiers. By the time the X-Men arrived on the scene, both villain teams had departed, with the whereabouts of the baby unknown. Rictor was planted as a mole to find out what the Purifiers were up to. When the New X-Men, led by Surge, took it upon themselves to attack the Purifiers in retaliation for their assault on the institute, it was revealed that the Purifiers had upgraded some of their best fighters with cybernetics, creating a new team of Reavers under the command of Stryker's one-time lover and X-Men foe Lady Deathstrike. While the New X-Men's raid did damage their primary church in Washington, the Purifiers managed to drive the mutants off, and then dispatched Deathstrike and the Reavers to find the mutant baby. Although the new Reavers have since been destroyed by Wolverine's incarnation of X-Force, the Purifiers' greater forces remain intact and ready to continue their crusade.

Shortly after the events of Messiah Complex and the dissolution of the X-Men, the Purifiers raided a heavily defended S.H.I.E.L.D. installation with the help of several double agents, murdering sixteen S.H.I.E.L.D. personnel before breaching the primary vault and recovering an unidentified artifact. The fact that the Purifiers launched an attack specifically on baseline humans rather than mutants worries Cyclops, who fears that whatever the Purifiers stole from S.H.I.E.L.D. was worth enough to risk bring down the agency's wrath upon them. As Cyclops moves to rally X-Force to combat the threat. The Purifiers bring the object, revealed to be the head of Bastion, to one of their churches, installing it onto the Nimrod unit they recovered from Forge's Aerie to return the mutant-killing machine to life. At that point, the church is assaulted by the new X-Force, though Risman manages to capture Wolfsbane in the process. Bastion reveals his secret weapon in his war against mutants; he seeks out the Technarchy leader, Magus, who is lying in the bottom of the ocean, and takes one of Magus' non-sentient offspring to graft it into himself.

After the salvaging of Magus, the Purifiers, acting on Bastion's orders, seek out a number of prominent anti-mutant leaders. They forcibly recruit Donald Pierce, save the Leper Queen from execution, retrieve Cameron Hodge from a crater in Mount Everest, and dig up the corpses of Graydon Creed, Stephen Lang, Bolivar Trask and Reverend Stryker himself. To Risman's objection, they are all bonded with the Technarch offspring, which reanimates the dead and places all of them under the control of Bastion himself.

Meanwhile, the Purifiers use a brainwashed Wolfsbane to attack Warren Worthington III and obtain his wings, which, even though they appear to be fully organic, are still composed of Apocalypse's techno-organic strain. Using the sample, the Purifiers employ a scientist named Adam Harkins to duplicate the strain and use it to create an elite team of Purifiers called "the Choir." Risman leads the Choir against Bastion's Purifiers in an attempt to destroy Bastion and the reanimated remains of Stryker, considering them unholy.

Archangel later attacked the Purifiers in an attempt to reclaim the wings that were stolen from him, killing every member of the Choir. During that point, Matthew Risman is shot in the head by X-23 around the point where Matthew tried to kill Bastion. Wolfsbane ends up killing Reverend Craig under her brainwashing.

Bastion leads the Purifiers in an even more genocidal direction, injecting powered mutants with the modified strain of the Legacy Virus to causes countless deaths and create fear and chaos.

During the Second Coming storyline, Bastion was seen with Stephen Lang, Bolivar Trask, William Stryker, Graydon Creed and Cameron Hodge stating that their forces are assembled and at his disposal. Bastion tells them that the Mutant Messiah has returned and gives them orders to kill her. Later, Bastion attempts to kill Hope on his own, but he is confronted by Rogue and then damaged when Nightcrawler sacrifices himself to save Hope. Bastion would later confront Hope, again defeated, and then destroyed by her.

During the 2011 "Fear Itself" storyline, the global chaos caused by Skadi and the Worthy leads a splinter group of Purifiers to believe that the world is coming to an end and that an appearance by the Devil is imminent, spurring them to "save" as many people as they can. Purifiers member Jonathan Standish also kidnaps a young superhero and uses his webcam stating that the superhumans are the reasons behind the current chaos in the world. X-Force ends up having to track down Jonathan Standish as he pulls the trigger on the superhero. Wolverine and X-23 learn from Deadpool and Fantomex that the young superhero was identified to be Daniel Chilton. They also state that about 3,000 people have committed suicide following that global broadcast. Wolverine and Archangel then interrogate Benedict Ryan on what he knows about Jonathan Standish.

Following the Avengers vs. X-Men storyline, the Purifiers ambush a prison transport in order to assassinate Emma Frost. They were repelled by the New Avengers members Luke Cage, Mockingbird, Daredevil, and The Thing who were guarding her.

They later re-appeared during the All-New X-Men series where they were targeting an amnesiac X-23 to whom the past X-Men have to protect. It was later revealed during this encounter that, William Stryker's son Jason Stryker who at one point was believed to have been killed as an infant by his father for being a mutant is still alive. He was secretly sent to A.I.M. by his father as a child to have his powers suppressed and has replaced his late father as the new leader of the Purifiers. Jason was defeated and arrested by S.H.I.E.L.D.

Membership

Current members
 Jack Abrams
 Anne 
 Brother Paul McGuinness
 Rocco 
 Sister Mary
 Jonathan Standish
 Benedict Ryan
 Jason Stryker - Current leader

Former members
 Joaquin Murrieta (Rictor) - Requested by Cyclops to work as spy since he was depowered.
 Taylor - Expelled for the infiltration of Rictor.
 Nimrod - Blasted out of the timestream by Surge.
 Father Matthew Risman - Second leader. He was scarred by Dust and later shot in the head by X-23.
 Reverend Craig - A fanatically hostile Scottish pastor who previously raised (and was secretly the father of) Wolfsbane. Mauled to death and eaten by Wolfsbane.
 Eli Bard - Left the Purifiers after getting himself infected by the transmode virus and joined with Selene to ignite the Necrosha event. 
 Leper Queen - Shot and killed by X-23.
 Adam Harkins - A member of the Facility who is the creator of the Choir.
 Gabriel - Leader of The Choir. Killed by Archangel.
 William Stryker - Founder and first leader. Killed by Elixir and reanimated by Bastion. Later cut in two by Archangel.
 Cameron Hodge - Killed when his lifeforce and the lifeforces of the Smileys are forcibly absorbed by Warlock via their shared connection of the technorganic Transmode virus.
 Donald Pierce - Destroyed by an optic blast from Cyclops. Though later revived, he does not rejoin.
 Bolivar Trask - Killed himself after escaping from Bastion's control.
 Graydon Creed - Resurrected in Weapon X #27 (2017) by Azazel.
 Stephen Lang - Killed during the final battle with the so-called Mutant Messiah.
 Bastion - Returned to life by the Purifiers. Ultimately destroyed by Hope Summers during the final battle of Second Coming.

The Choir
In X-Force #4 using a brainwashed Wolfsbane, the Purifiers obtained Angel's wings. Using the blood from them, they were able to extract Apocalypse's techno-organic strain and grafted the strain into a group of Purifiers, some willing and some not. Those that received the grafts grew techno-organic wings very similar to Angel's Archangel wings. This group was dubbed "The Choir" and was created to "strike down Satan's spawn with God's own might." One of the Purifiers known only as "Gabriel" is the first to receive the graft and does so willingly and is appointed leader of the Choir by Father Risman. Gabriel and two other members of the Choir escaped Archangel's massacre of the Choir.

Powers and abilities
Being baseline humans, the Purifiers possess no superhuman abilities to speak of, relying on superior technology in their genocidal campaign against mutants. The Purifiers possess a variety of deadly armaments and munitions, some more conventional weapons like assault rifles, Flame throwers and anti-tank rockets, as well as more advanced and expensive equipment like Vibranium-based weaponry. The group also used the knowledge contained within Nimrod's memory banks to great effect, although that advantage was lost when the Sentinel reactivated and destroyed its keepers, before being defeated by the New X-Men.

The Purifiers are all highly trained, and have been shown to be capable of holding their own against both O.N.E. troopers and the X-Men. The group also possesses links to allied churches all over the world, and their membership includes corporate elites, political figures and intelligence personnel. This allows the Purifiers to avoid reprisals from law-enforcement agencies for their terrorist actions, like their raids on the Xavier Institute or the massacre at Cooperstown, Alaska. Combined with their secret nature and fanatical determination, the Purifiers are undoubtedly a deadly foe and a cause of great concern for the remaining mutants.

Other versions

Ultimate Purifers
 Ultimate Purifers appear in the Ultimate Marvel universe during post Ultimatum. The Purifiers were a radical group of mutant-hating extremists that emerged after the Ultimate Wave destroyed New York, led by Reverend Stryker Jr. Equipped with stolen weapons and Sentinel technology, they hunt the remaining X-Men led by Kitty Pryde as Shroud.

In other media

Television
 A loose organization of Purifers appear on Fox's The Gifted set in the film series. The Purifers make their debut in the episode "3 X 1" as hooded, anti-mutant bigots who set Blink's car on fire. The Purifers appear in season two with their history revealed as being founded by Matthew Risman while he planted his sister Madeline into Trask Industries. They are led by TV personality/anti-mutant advocate Benedict Ryan (portrayed by Peter Gallagher) and in collision with the Inner Circle. The Purifiers also eventually induct ex-Sentinel Services Agent Jace Turner into their group.

Films
Reverend Craig (played by Happy Anderson) makes an appearance as an illusion come to life in the 2020 film The New Mutants; it is implied that Rahne killed him after he had branded her.

Video games
 The Purifiers make an appearance as antagonists in X-Men: Destiny. They are present during an anti-Mutant rally where hostilities emerge. One of the playable characters, Adrian Luca, is in fact the son and member of the Purifiers when his Mutant power activates during the rally. Purifiers are shown to be equipped for a war with hi-tech weaponry and formed an alliance with the U-Men to replicate Mutant powers. Ultimately, it's revealed that the entire alliance and conflict had been orchestrated by Bastion to promote hostilities.
 The Purifiers appear in the video game Marvel Heroes. They cause anti-mutant hysteria and attack Mutant Town when there is an increase of mutant population in New York City.

References

External links
 The Purifiers at Marvel.com

Marvel Comics supervillain teams
Fictional organizations in Marvel Comics
Fictional mass murderers
Christianity in popular culture
Fictional private military members
Comic book terrorist organizations
Fictional cults
X-Men supporting characters